Edward Maitland Hadow (13 March 1863 – 20 February 1895) was an English first-class cricketer active 1883–93 who played for Middlesex and Marylebone Cricket Club. He was born in Sudbury Priory; died in Cannes.

He was educated at Harrow School for whom he would play cricket.

References
 ESPNcricinfo profile

1863 births
1895 deaths
English cricketers
Middlesex cricketers
Marylebone Cricket Club cricketers
I Zingari cricketers
North v South cricketers
Gentlemen of England cricketers
Orleans Club cricketers
People educated at Harrow School